The Wright R-2600 Cyclone 14 (also called Twin Cyclone) is an American radial engine developed by Curtiss-Wright and widely used in aircraft in the 1930s and 1940s.

History
In 1935, Curtiss-Wright began work on a more powerful version of their successful R-1820 Cyclone 9. The result was the R-2600 Twin Cyclone, with 14 cylinders arranged in two rows. The  R-2600-3 was originally intended for the C-46 Commando (being fitted to the prototype CW-20A). It was also the original engine choice for the F6F Hellcat; a running change (one which would not stop production) for the CW-20A, and one in late April 1942 for the second XF6F-1, led to the adoption of the  Pratt & Whitney R-2800 Double Wasp in the R-2600's place for both designs.

The Twin Cyclone went on to power several important American World War II aircraft, including the A-20 Havoc, B-25 Mitchell, TBF Avenger, SB2C Helldiver, and the PBM Mariner.

Over 50,000 R-2600s were built at plants in Paterson, New Jersey, and Cincinnati, Ohio.

Variants
 R-2600-1 - 1,600 hp (1,194 kW)
 R-2600-2 - 1,500 hp (1,118 kW)- Prototype variant; Few were made.
 R-2600-3 - 1,600 hp (1,194 kW)
 R-2600-4 - 1,650 hp (1,230 kW)
 R-2600-6 - 1,600 hp (1,194 kW)
 R-2600-8 - 1,700 hp (1,268 kW)
 R-2600-9 - 1,700 hp (1,268 kW)
 R-2600-10 - 1,700 hp (1,268 kW)- Experimental high-altitude R-2600 variant with a two-stage mechanical supercharger, vs the usual single-stage supercharger. The 2600-10 also served as a testbed for turbo-supercharging the 2600 series. Very few were produced.
 R-2600-11 - 1,600 hp (1,194 kW)
 R-2600-12 - 1,700 hp (1,268 kW)
 R-2600-13 - 1,700 hp (1,268 kW)
 R-2600-14 - 1,700 hp (1,268 kW)- One of the engines which powered Grumman's prototype F6Fs, the XF6F-1 (the two-stage supercharged R-2600-10 was also tested in the XF6F-1). Grumman was not happy with the performance, which led to the 2,000 hp Pratt & Whitney R-2800 engine replacing the R-2600 on F6F production models.
 R-2600-15 - 1,800 hp (1,342 kW)- Planned to power the XB-33A, a prototype model of the B-33 Super Marauder (itself a high-altitude version of the B-26 Marauder). The project was cancelled, and neither the prototype XB-33A or production B-33A were ever built.
 R-2600-16 - 1,700 hp (1,268 kW)- Similar to the R-2600-10 & -14, the -16 powered a Grumman prototype F6F, the XF6F-2.
 R-2600-19 - 1,600 hp (1,194 kW), 1,660 hp (1,237 kW)
 R-2600-20 - 1,700 hp (1,268 kW), 1,900 hp (1,420 kW)
 R-2600-22 - 1,900 hp (1,420 kW)
 R-2600-23 - 1,600 hp (1,194 kW)
 R-2600-29 - 1,700 hp (1,268 kW), 1,850 hp (1,380 kW)
 GR-2600-A5B - 1,500 hp (1,118 kW), 1,600 hp (1,194 kW), 1,700 hp (1,268 kW)
 GR-2600-A71 - 1,300 hp (969 kW)
 GR-2600-C14 - 1,750 hp (1,304 kW)

Applications

 Boeing 314 Clipper
 Brewster SB2A Buccaneer
 Curtiss SB2C Helldiver
 Douglas A-20 Havoc
 Douglas B-23 Dragon
 Grumman F6F Hellcat (XF6F-1 & -2 prototypes only, pre-April 1942)
 Grumman TBF Avenger
 Lioré et Olivier LeO 451
 Martin Baltimore
 Martin PBM Mariner (versions prior to Double Wasp-powered PBM-5)
 Miles Monitor
 North American B-25 Mitchell
 Vultee A-31 Vengeance

Specifications (GR-2600-C14BB)

See also

References

Notes

Bibliography

External links

1930s aircraft piston engines
Aircraft air-cooled radial piston engines
R-2600